Andra Whiteside (born 6 December 1989) is a Fijian squash and badminton player. She has represented Fiji in badminton at the 2006, 2018 Commonwealth Games and at the 2007, 2011, and 2019 Pacific Games. She also represented Fiji in squash at the 2015 Pacific Games. She plays as the third singles against Tahiti, helps the team to clinched the bronze medal.

On 3 September 2014, Whiteside won the National Squash Championships as her first major squash appearance, defeating Sharon Wild three to nothing. In September 2016, she won three National Badminton Championships titles in Suva's Yat Sen Hall for women's singles, women's doubles with her sister, Karen Whiteside, against Chloe Kumar and Shannon Quai Hoi, and the mixed doubles A-grade with Jason Low against Martin Feussner and Sina Quai Hoi. Some time in that year, she began to train newer badminton players and coach them, and played against Danielle Whiteside, her cousin, on 25 June 2016 in the Woman's A Singles for that year, defeating her.

In 2009, Whiteside was nominated by the Fiji Badminton Association and selected by FASANOC to join Peter Taylor as representatives of Fiji for the 2008 Olympic Youth Camp, held from 5–19 August 2008.

Achievements

Pacific Games 
Women's singles

Women's doubles

Mixed doubles

BWF International Challenge/Series 
Women's singles

'Women's doubles''

  BWF International Challenge tournament
  BWF International Series tournament
  BWF Future Series tournament

References

External links 
 Andra Whiteside at melbourne2006.com.au

Living people
1989 births
Sportspeople from Suva
Fijian female badminton players
Badminton players at the 2018 Commonwealth Games
Badminton players at the 2006 Commonwealth Games
Commonwealth Games competitors for Fiji
Fijian female squash players